Jung-won, also spelled Jeong-won, is a Korean unisex given name. Its meaning differs based on the hanja used to write each syllable of the name. There are 84 hanja with the reading "jung" and 46 hanja with the reading "won" on the South Korean government's official list of hanja which may be registered for use in given names.

People
People with this name include:

Kim Jung-won (born 1931), South Korean politician
Ha Jung-won (born 1942), North Korean football defender
Park Jung-won (born 1962), South Korean businessman, chairman of Doosan Group
Choi Jung-won (actress, born 1969), South Korean actress
Seo Jung-won (born 1970), South Korean football coach
Moon Jeong-won (born 1980), South Korean florist and wife of Lee Hwi-jae
Choi Jung-won (actress, born 1981), South Korean actress
Choi Jung-won (singer) (born 1981), South Korean singer
Cha Jung-won (born Cha Mi-young, 1989), South Korean actress
Choi Jung-won (speed skater) (born 1990), South Korean female short track speed skater
Jang Jung-won (born 1992), South Korean football midfielder
Yang Jung-won (born 2004), South Korean singer, member of Enhypen

Fictional characters
Fictional characters with this name include:

Jung-won, male lead character in 1998 South Korean film Christmas in August
Kang Jung-won, male lead character in 2003 South Korean film The Uninvited
Yoo Jung-won, female character in 2008 South Korean film Do Re Mi Fa So La Ti Do
Ahn Jeong-won, male lead character in 2020 South Korean drama Hospital Playlist

See also
List of Korean given names
Hanam Jungwon (1876–1951), dharma name of Korean Buddhist monk
Kim Jung-won (born 1973), North Korean long-distance runner 
Lee Jung-won (born 1989), South Korean male football fullback (K-League)

References

Korean unisex given names